Ajoomma (literally: "Auntie") is a Singaporean-South Korean drama film directed by He Shuming and co-produced by Anthony Chen. It stars Hong Hui Fang, Kang Hyung-seok and Jung Dong-hwan.

The film garnered four nominations at the 59th Golden Horse Awards and Hong became the first Singaporean to be nominated for the Best Leading Actress award. It premiered at the 2022 Busan International Film Festival on 7 October 2022 and opened in local cinemas on 27 October 2022. The film was selected as the Singaporean entry for the Best International Feature Film at the 95th Academy Awards.

Cast
Hong Hui Fang as Auntie
Kang Hyung-seok as Kwon-Woo
Jung Dong-hwan as Jung Su
Yeo Jin-goo as Jae Sung 
Shane Pow as Sam

Production
The film is touted as the first official Singapore-South Korean co-production. The filming was interrupted by COVID-19 pandemic. It was mostly shot in South Korea, with Hong filming there between end of December 2021 and February 2022. Filming was completed by early April 2022.

Awards and nominations

See also
 List of submissions to the 95th Academy Awards for Best International Feature Film
 List of Singaporean submissions for the Academy Award for Best International Feature Film

References

External links
 

2022 films
Singaporean drama films
Films set in Singapore
Films set in South Korea
Films shot in Singapore
Films shot in South Korea
2022 drama films
2022 directorial debut films